Godfrey Tawonezvi is an Anglican bishop in Zimbabwe: he has been the inaugural Bishop of Masvingo since 
2002.

References

Anglican bishops of Masvingo
21st-century Anglican bishops in Africa
Zimbabwean people